Anthresh Lalit Lakra (born 22 October 1983) is an Indian boxer who fought at the 2008 Summer Olympics as a featherweight.

Career
He won the Commonwealth Championships 2005 against Stephen Smith.

He missed the Commonwealth Games and the Asian Games 2006 but won silver at the 2006 Southeast Asian Games where he lost the final to Mehrullah Lassi.

At the World Military Games 2007 in his country he beat North Korean Kim Won Il but lost to Shili Alaa.

At the World championships 2007 he beat Bahodir Karimov and upset Shahin Imranov and qualified for Beijing before losing to Chinese Yang Li.

At the Olympics he lost his first bout to Bahodirjon Sultonov 5:9.

References
 2005 Commonwealth
 S.E Asian Games 2006
 Yahoo data

Boxers at the 2008 Summer Olympics
1983 births
Olympic boxers of India
Living people
Indian male boxers
Featherweight boxers
People from Jamshedpur
Boxers from Jharkhand